The 1982 British National Track Championships were a series of track cycling competitions held from 25 July – 1 August 1982 at the Leicester Velodrome.

Medal summary

Men's Events

Women's Events

References

1982 in British sport
July 1982 sports events in the United Kingdom
August 1982 sports events in the United Kingdom